Andrew Johnson (February 18, 1844 – July 29, 1921) was a Swedish–American architect and contractor  He designed 61 documented or attributed buildings in Panola County, Mississippi and at least 16 more in North Mississippi, Tennessee, and Arkansas. Several of his works are listed on the U.S. National Register of Historic Places.

Anders Jönsson was born in the parish of Ovansjö in the county of Gävleborg, Sweden. He was  trained at Uppsala University where he received an award from King Charles XV of Sweden for his contest winning design
 He used the prize money to emigrate to America in 1865, where his building career lasted from 1870 to 1910.

After arriving in the United States, his name was changed  to Andrew Johnson. He first settled in a Swedish-American community in Evanston, Illinois. About 1870, he moved to Sardis, Mississippi where  he became associated with James B. Cook, an English-trained architect who had moved from London to Memphis, Tennessee in 1855.  Johnson served as contractor building the Second Empire style Panola County Courthouse that Cook designed and was built in 1873 and as contractor on at least two other buildings.  Johnson and Cook collaborated on at least two other buildings.

Works
Col. Chap Anderson House, 402 N. Jackson St. Kosciusko, MS, NRHP-listed
Ballentine-Bryant House, 506 Butler St. Sardis, MS (with son), NRHP-listed
Ballentine-Seay House, Pocahontas St. Sardis, MS, NRHP-listed
Byhalia Historic District, Roughly, along Church, Chulahoma (MS 309) and Senter Sts. Byhalia, MS (with sons), NRHP-listed
Byhalia United Methodist Church, College Ave. Byhalia, MS, NRHP-listed
Craig-Seay House, Craig St. Como, MS, NRHP-listed
Crenshaw House, MS 310 Crenshaw, MS, NRHP-listed
Hall-Henderson House, Sycamore St. Sardis, MS, NRHP-listed
Hall-Roberson House, 510 S. Main St. Sardis, MS, NRHP-listed
Holy Innocents' Episcopal Church, Jct. of Main & Craig St. Como, MS, NRHP-listed
Hufft House, 117 Pocahontas St. Sardis, MS, NRHP-listed
Johnson-Tate Cottage, Stonewall St. Sardis, MS, NRHP-listed
John Curtis Kyle House, 109 McLaurin St. Sardis, MS, NRHP-listed
Lee House, 201 Booth St. Batesville, MS, NRHP-listed
Popular Price Store, Railroad St. Como, MS, NRHP-listed
Short's Hill, 203 Childress St. Sardis, MS, NRHP-listed
St. John's Catholic Church (1872) in Como, Mississippi
Tait-Taylor House, Oak Ave. Como, MS, NRHP-listed
Taylor-Falls House, Pointer Ave. Como, MS, NRHP-listed
Taylor-Mansker House, Railroad St. Como, MS, NRHP-listed
Taylor-Wall-Yancy House, 114 Sycamore St. Sardis, MS, NRHP-listed
Walton-Howry House, 308 S. Main St. Sardis, MS, NRHP-listed
Wardlaw-Swango House, Railroad St. Como, MS, NRHP-listed

References

American architects
1844 births
1921 deaths
Uppsala University alumni
People from Gävleborg County
Swedish emigrants to the United States
People from Sardis, Mississippi